Des Plaines is one of two commuter railroad stations on Metra's Union Pacific Northwest Line in Des Plaines, Illinois.

Parking is mostly available along the streets on either side of the tracks. Primarily this includes Miner Street between southeast of Perry Street and west of Des Plaines River Road. Other parking areas exist along Ellinwood Street between Pearson Street and Des Plaines River Road east of the Des Plaines Public Library, a lot on Webford Avenue off of Graceland Avenue (southbound US 12 / 45), and on Prairie Avenue east of Pearson Street.

As of April 25, 2022, Des Plaines is served by 59 trains (29 inbound, 30 outbound) on weekdays, by 31 trains (16 inbound, 15 outbound) on Saturdays, and by 19 trains (nine inbound, 10 outbound) on Sundays.

On weekdays, two inbound trains originate at Des Plaines, and two outbound trains terminate at Des Plaines.

Bus connections
Pace

  208 Golf Road 
  209 Busse Highway (weekdays only) 
  226 Oakton Street (weekdays only) 
  230 South Des Plaines (weekdays only) 
  234 Wheeling/Des Plaines (weekdays only) 
  250 Dempster Street 
  619 Des Plaines Station/Willow Rd. Corridor (weekday rush hours only)

References

External links
Metra - Des Plaines Station
Chicago Railfan.net:
Des Plaines Station
Des Plaines Freight Sidings and Other Views
Station from Pearson Street from Google Maps Street View
Station from Lee Street from Google Maps Street View

Des Plaines
Des Plaines Station
Former Chicago and North Western Railway stations
1915 establishments in Illinois
Railway stations in Cook County, Illinois
Railway stations in the United States opened in 1915